Nozawana (野沢菜, Brassica rapa L. var. hakabura) is a Japanese leaf vegetable, often pickled. It is of the same species as the common turnip and one of a Japanese variety of mustard leaf. Its leaves are approximately 60–90 cm long.

Traditionally it is thought that sometime between 1751 and 1764 the plant was brought from the Kyoto mountains to the Nozawa-onsen village  by the master of a Buddhist temple who lived in Nozawa. It was since cultivated around that area, and thus named Nozawana: na means vegetable in Japanese.

Pickled nozawana is one of the most typical local foods in Nagano Prefecture. It is also used in onigiri.

References 

Leaf vegetables
Brassica
Japanese pickles